German submarine U-349 was a Type VIIC U-boat of Nazi Germany's Kriegsmarine during World War II.

She carried out no patrols. She did not sink or damage any ships.

She was scuttled on 5 May 1945 in northern Germany.

Design
German Type VIIC submarines were preceded by the shorter Type VIIB submarines. U-349 had a displacement of  when at the surface and  while submerged. She had two shafts and two  propellers.

U-349 was fitted with five  torpedo tubes (four fitted at the bow and one at the stern), fourteen torpedoes, one  SK C/35 naval gun, 220 rounds, and two twin  C/30 anti-aircraft guns. The boat had a complement of between forty-four and sixty.

Service history
The submarine was laid down on 29 December 1942 at the Nordseewerke yard at Emden as yard number 221, launched on 22 July 1943 and commissioned on 8 September under the command of Oberleutnant zur See Ernst Lotter. She served with the 22nd U-boat Flotilla from 8 September 1943, the 23rd flotilla from 1 October and the 31st flotilla from 1 March 1945. U-349 was scuttled on 5 May 1945 in Gelting Bay, (east of Flensburg). One man died when he refused to leave the boat. The wreck was broken up in 1948.

References

Bibliography

External links

German Type VIIC submarines
U-boats commissioned in 1943
1943 ships
Ships built in Emden
World War II submarines of Germany
Operation Regenbogen (U-boat)
Maritime incidents in May 1945